John of Eschenden  was a fourteenth-century English astrologer. He was supposed to have predicted the onset of the Black Death. He also was one of those applying astrological techniques to the Apocalypse. Eschenden's reputation was assured by the 1489 publication of the Summa astrologiae judicialis (Summa Anglicana), attributed to him.

Notes

External links 
 Summa astrologiae iudicialis. [s.l.] : [s.n.], 1489. 454 p. Incunabula - available online at University Library in Bratislava Digital Library

Year of birth missing
14th-century deaths
English astrologers
14th-century astrologers